Lalchandabad is a suburb of Mirpurkhas city, Sindh, Pakistan.

References

Mirpurkhas's populated places are khisak pura, baldia shopping center, old mundi, bashir a bad old khipro stand.

Populated places in Sindh